Poluwat, also Polowat, formerly Puluwat, is a coral atoll and a municipality of Chuuk state, Federated States of Micronesia.

Geography
Polowat is located in the northwestern region (Oksoritod), and there in the western area (Pattiw) of Chuuk state. The atoll has five islets (including itself) lying on the rim of the reef, with an aggregate land area of 3.4 km2, listed counterclockwise starting at Polowat in the southeast:
Polowat (east)
Alengelap (north rim)
To (north rim)
Alei (west)
Haw (south)

Since Polowat Atoll has only a small lagoon, in comparison with most Micronesian atolls, the total size is only 7 km2. Alei in the west and Polowat in the east, the two largest islands of the atoll, have breadfruit trees at the middle and coconut palms along the shores. 
Along the northern rim of the reef, between Polowat and Alei, are Alengelap Islet and To Islet. The southern corner of the atoll is marked by Haw Islet, with 0.02 km2 the smallest. These smaller islets are rocky and wooded, but have few coconut palms.

Polowat Atoll and specifically Alei Island are the westernmost land features of Chuuk state.

There are three villages on the west side of Polowat Island, facing the lagoon, with a total population of 1,015 (census of 2000), from north to south:
Relong
Lukaf
Rewow

Uranie Bank, which extends about 26 km southeast from Polowat, has depths of 11 to 61 meters. Together with Polowat Atoll, it might be considered part of a larger, mostly submerged atoll structure, with a total size of 332 km2.

Enderby Bank, with a depth of 16 meters, coral, lies about 5 km west-northwest of Alei Island.

Climate

History
It was discovered by Spanish naval officer Juan Antonio de Ibargoitia commanding the vessel Filipino on 7 April 1801.

The Japanese garrison during World War II was composed of 2,769 IJA men of the 11th Independent Mixed Regiment under the command of Colonel Tatsuo Yasui and 243 IJN men. Due to a food shortage 2 of the 3 army battalions were moved to Truk but still, 335 IJA soldiers and 211 IJN soldiers on the island died of hunger and illness. Japanese defense bunkers from the years leading up to World War II and a white concrete lighthouse tower, 40 meters high, stand on the northwest end of Alei. There are also many Japanese relics from World War II on Alei, including a beached ship that was attacked by American aircraft.  At the bottom of the larger lagoon lies an American plane, also from World War II.  The Japanese Lighthouse, is listed on the U.S. National Register of Historic Places.

Communications
There is a radio station on Polowat.

Notes

See also
 Puluwat language or Puluwatese

References

External links
NASA Satellite Image

Atolls of the Federated States of Micronesia
Municipalities of Chuuk State